Eighteenth century women poets: an Oxford anthology is a poetry anthology edited by Roger Lonsdale and published in 1989 by the Oxford University Press. In the introduction, Lonsdale notes that while the featured writers may have flourished, to one degree or another, during the eighteenth century, by the time he came to collect their work, many of them had "disappeared from view." Scholars since have credited Lonsdale's "unprecedented" work for opening up new avenues for teaching and research. The collection comprises three hundred and twenty-three separate poems by one hundred and seven different poets, fifteen of whom remain anonymous. The entries are arranged chronologically, and each includes a biographical note.

Poets represented

Notes

Etext
Lonsdale, Roger, ed. Eighteenth century women poets: an Oxford anthology. OUP, 1989. Open access from the Internet Archive.

External links
 Eighteenth century women poets at Open Library
 
 Eighteenth century women poets at Goodreads
Eighteenth century women poets 
Eighteenth century women poets at Library Thing

1989 poetry books
Eighteenth century women poets
British poetry anthologies
Women
1989 anthologies